Godfrey William Zaunbrecher (born December 17, 1946) is a former American football center who played three seasons with the Minnesota Vikings of the National Football League (NFL). He was drafted by the Minnesota Vikings in the eleventh round of the 1970 NFL Draft. He played college football at Louisiana State University and attended St. Michael's High School in Crowley, Louisiana.

College career
Zaunbrecher played for the LSU Tigers from 1967 to 1969. He started his final two seasons, earning Second-team All-SEC honors in 1968 and First-team All-SEC accolades in 1969. He was also named to the East–West Shrine Game his junior year and the Senior Bowl his senior season.

Professional career
Zaunbrecher was selected by the Minnesota Vikings with the 286th pick in the 1970 NFL Draft and played for the team until 1973.

References

External links
Just Sports Stats

Living people
1946 births
Players of American football from Louisiana
American football centers
LSU Tigers football players
Minnesota Vikings players
People from Crowley, Louisiana